The tropical gar (Atractosteus tropicus) is a species of fish from Central America, where it is found in the Pacific and Atlantic drainages from southern Mexico to Costa Rica. In Central America it is known as gaspar and in Mexico it is known as pejelagarto, a contraction of the words "pez" (fish) and "lagarto" (alligator). This gar inhabits a wide range of fresh and brackish water habitats such as rivers, floodplains, lakes and pools, but avoids areas with a strong current. The tropical gar looks very similar to the longnose gar in color and markings, but can be distinguished by its shorter, broader snout. The tropical gar's diet consists mainly of cichlids and other fish.

While gar are not widely eaten, there is a traditional Tabasco dish of the same name that uses chili, limes, and salt to cook the animal.

References

External links

Lepisosteidae
Mexican cuisine
Freshwater fish of Central America
Freshwater fish of Mexico
Fish described in 1863
Taxa named by Theodore Gill